Herbert George Yarnall (1892–1943) was an English professional footballer who played as a forward in the Scottish League for Airdrieonians, Clydebank and Dumbarton. He was the top scorer in the Scottish League Division One during the 1916–17 season, with 39 goals. Yarnall also played in the Football League for Blackpool and Reading.

Career statistics

Honours 

 Scottish League Division One top scorer: 1916–17

References

Airdrieonians F.C. (1878) players
Scottish Football League players
Scottish league football top scorers
English footballers
People from Goole
1892 births
1943 deaths
Place of death missing
Blackpool F.C. players
English Football League players
Dumbarton F.C. players
Reading F.C. players
Association football forwards
Clydebank F.C. (1914) players